Jaundubulti is a residential area and neighbourhood of the city Jūrmala, Latvia.

History 
The village was slowly populated during the 1870s, when railways were built near the area. The railways also created Edinburgh and Bulduri.

Landmarks

Jaundubulti Secondary School 
The Jaundubulti Secondary School is a school located in the village. It was built in 1870 by I. Felsko. In the 1960s, the school was demolished. However, it was rebuilt in 1969. In 1992, the school was renamed Jūrmala City Jaundubulti Secondary School.

Jaundubulti Station 

Jaundubulti Station is a railway station on the Torņakalns – Tukums II Railway

References

External links 

Neighbourhoods in Jūrmala